"911" is a song by British virtual band Gorillaz and American hip-hop group D12 and features guest vocals from the Specials member Terry Hall. The song was recorded without Eminem during 2001 in West London, when D12 were left stranded in England after the 9/11 terrorist attacks on New York City.

Background
The song was recorded without Eminem by Gorillaz and D12 in Damon Albarn's personal studio in West London. The track came about after the 9/11 terrorist attacks in New York City, leaving the band stranded in England; Albarn invited the band to his studio while they were there and played them an early demo of the track. Albarn had always wanted to experiment with Middle-Eastern music, and felt that this song would be perfect. D12 added additional production to the song, before laying down their verses. Terry Hall appears on the song as a vocal harmony with Albarn for the song's chorus. Albarn and Hall had previously spoken about collaborating together, however when Hall revealed that he had been taking singing lessons from a Middle-Eastern singer, it inspired Albarn to take the song in a different direction.

Music video
The video features the same visuals as "Clint Eastwood" and "19-2000", but with a different background. The track features D12 running towards the camera. Terry Hall does not appear in the music video.

Live performances
Played live only twice, at the New York City Hammerstein Ballroom concert of Gorillaz Live in 2002. The song was also performed with Luton-based rap group Phi Life Cypher, at the Isle of MTV Festival in Lisbon, Portugal.

Track listing
"911" – 05:50
"911" (Clean Version) – 05:50
'911' (Short Version Ultra-Clean) – 05:00

Song credits
Gorillaz – vocals
Proof – vocals
Kuniva – vocals
Bizarre – vocals
Swifty McVay – vocals
Mr. Porter – vocals
Terry Hall – vocals
Von Carlisle – vocals
Ondre Moore – vocals
Tom Girling – engineering, Pro Tools
Jason Cox – engineering, Pro Tools

References

2001 songs
2001 singles
Gorillaz songs
D12 songs
Terry Hall (singer) songs
Parlophone singles
EMI Records singles
Hollywood Records singles
Songs written by Damon Albarn
Music about the September 11 attacks
Songs written by Jamie Hewlett
Songs written by Denaun Porter
Songs written by Terry Hall (singer)
Songs written by Bizarre (rapper)